Controversy in Russia regarding the legitimacy of eastward NATO expansion is one of the conflicting moments in relations between Russia and NATO. The Russian authorities claim that agreement on non-expansion of NATO to Eastern Europe took place orally and the alliance violated it with its expansion while the leaders of the alliance claim that no such promise was made and that such a decision could only be made in writing. Soviet President Mikhail Gorbachev, who participated in the 1990 negotiations, subsequently spoke out about the existence of a "guarantee of non-expansion of NATO to the east" inconsistently, confirming its existence in some interviews and refuting in others. Among academic researchers, opinions on the existence or absence of a non-extension agreement also differ.

An active discussion related to this issue unfolded in Russia and in the world against the background of the Russian proposals on international security at the end of 2021 and the aggravation of the situation around the 2022 Russian invasion of Ukraine. The position of Russia in such circumstances is that the question of the existence of an agreement on the non-expansion of NATO in the eastern direction should be considered in the context of relations between Russia and NATO and Russia and the United States, since it determines the likelihood of a potentially possible entry of Ukraine into NATO, which is considered a threat to Russia. The NATO leadership points out that the decision to limit the expansion of NATO has never been taken, and its adoption would entail a change in the fundamental documents of the alliance, and the support of Ukraine by NATO cannot pose a threat to Russia.

Historical context 
The proposal not to expand NATO eastward, which was one of the ways Western countries took the initiative on the issue of German reunification and reducing the possibility of the Soviet Union's influence on this process, was based on the provisions of the speech of German Foreign Minister Hans-Dietrich Genscher in Tutzing, announced on January 31, 1990. In it, the minister, among other things, called on NATO to unequivocally state: "no matter what happens in the Warsaw Pact countries, there will be no expansion of NATO territory to the east, that is, closer to the borders of the Soviet Union." Genscher's speech was prepared by him without coordination with German Chancellor Helmut Kohl, to whom he was a political competitor on the eve of the upcoming parliamentary elections and from whom he sought to "seize the laurels of the unifier of Germany", at the same time, his proposals aroused interest among the leadership of Western countries, which began to consider the possibility of obtaining the consent of the USSR to the unification of Germany in exchange to limit the expansion of NATO. On February 2, the Minister outlined his plan to US Secretary of State James Baker, and on February 6 — to British Foreign Minister Douglas Gird. Genscher explained that the proposed restriction would be applicable to both the GDR and Eastern European countries. 10 days after his speech in Tutzing, Genscher repeated his words in an interview with Shevardnadze: "It is clear to us that membership in NATO creates difficult problems. However, one thing is clear to us: NATO will not expand to the east." Two days later, Genscher repeats the statement at a press conference with Baker in Washington: "As I said, NATO has no intentions of expanding to the east."

The American-West German position became the basis for negotiations on February 7–10, 1990 with the USSR, which became key in the dispute over the existence of an agreement that followed years later. During these negotiations, representatives of the United States and West Germany have repeatedly linked the unification of Germany with the limitation of NATO expansion. So, on February 9, 1990, at a meeting with Soviet Foreign Minister Eduard Shevardnadze, James Baker stated that the United States was striving for a united Germany that would remain "firmly tied to NATO," promising at the same time "iron guarantees that NATO jurisdiction or forces would not move eastward." Later that day, at a meeting with Soviet President Mikhail Gorbachev, he acknowledged that "It is important for the Soviet Union and other European countries to have guarantees that if the United States maintains its presence in Germany within the framework of NATO, there will be no extension of NATO's jurisdiction or military presence by a single inch in the eastern direction". and, in addition, he asked Gorbachev whether he would prefer a united Germany "outside NATO, completely independent, without American troops, or a united Germany that retains ties with NATO, but with a guarantee that, that the jurisdiction or NATO troops will not extend to the east of the current line." When Gorbachev replied that "the expansion of the NATO zone is unacceptable," Baker agreed with this. In response, the head of the Soviet state told Baker that "a lot of what you said seems realistic" and urged him to "think about it." Baker, at a press conference in Moscow on the same day, made public the resulting exchange, saying that the United States proposed, in order to mitigate the concerns of "those who are east of Germany," to prevent the expansion of NATO forces in the eastern direction and stated that the unification of Germany, according to the US position, is hardly possible without "certain security guarantees" with regard to the advance of NATO forces or its operation to the east. Later, in its February 13 press release sent to embassies, the US State Department indicated that "the Secretary of State made it clear that the US supports a united Germany in NATO, but is ready to ensure that NATO's military presence will not expand further to the east."

Baker's assurances were echoed by a number of other officials. So, on February 9, 1990, a similar guarantee (a united Germany "linked to NATO" but provided that "NATO troops will not go further east than they are located") was offered by Robert Gates, Deputy National Security Adviser to the US President, in his conversation with the head of the KGB of the USSR, Vladimir Kryuchkov, and he described it as "an impressive offer"; this allowed us to speak of broader support for such than is claimed in a number of works, and conflicts with subsequent statements about the "speculative" nature of the statements. On February 10, 1990, negotiations took place between the Soviet and West German sides, at which German Chancellor Kohl and German Foreign Minister Genscher gave assurances about the non-expansion of NATO, assuring Shevardnadze that "the membership of a united Germany in NATO raises a number of difficult issues. For us, however, one thing is absolutely clear: NATO will not extend to the east. And, since the absence of NATO expansion is determined, this is true in the general case." As a result of negotiations with Kohl, the Soviet leadership gave the go-ahead for the creation of a monetary union of the GDR and the FRG, which became the first step towards the unification of Germany. And on February 13, 1990, at a conference in Ottawa, the Soviet leadership agreed to West German proposals for negotiations in the "2+4" format on resolving security issues in connection with the unification of Germany, and, as stated in the diary of Shevardnadze's assistant, journalist Teymuraz Mamaladze, the day before Baker assured Shevardnadze that "if a united Germany If it remains in NATO, then it will be necessary to take care not to expand its jurisdiction to the East."

Meanwhile, while Baker and Gates were discussing the "non-expansion promise" with the Soviet leadership, its content was also criticized by the American leadership, since it could also be interpreted as leaving East Germany outside NATO's security guarantees. On February 9, US President George H.W. Bush sent a letter to Helmut Kohl in order to clarify the US position, in which the component of the presence of a united Germany in NATO assumed the "special military status" of the former GDR (although that one, between Baker's letters, reported on his conversation with Gorbachev and the "non-expansion of the NATO zone", and Bush chose the first, in an effort to achieve the result he needed in the form of the USSR's consent to the unification of Germany, and assured the head of the Soviet state about the non-expansion of NATO). At the Camp David summit, the leaders of the United States and Germany agreed on their positions on the proposals to the Soviet side: the former GDR was supposed to be granted a "special military status", in which all of Germany would be considered a member of NATO and fall under the collective security guarantees of the bloc, the alliance would have "jurisdiction" over the territory of the former GDR even if they were not stationed there NATO military structures.

In this regard, there is an opinion that in February 1990 there was a significant change of position, which "crossed out" the early assurances and closed the opportunity for the Soviet leadership to fix them. On the other hand, it is argued that the negotiations were structured in such a way that the leadership of the USSR considered the early assurances to be valid — in particular, the statements of American diplomacy about the "non-separation" of Eastern Europe from the USSR could be understood in this way, and the possibility of unilaterally changing the position to cancel the previous "obligations" is criticized.

At the same time, during the meeting on May 31, 1990, Gorbachev directly supported the wording of the joint public statement proposed by George Bush: "The United States unequivocally supports the membership of a united Germany in NATO; however, if Germany makes a different choice, we will not challenge it, we will respect it."

Between the nomination of the "special status" and the signing of the settlement agreement (spring—autumn 1990), Western leaders actively "encouraged" the USSR: the calculation, allegedly, was that it would approve the unification of Germany and its membership in NATO if it was "sufficiently sweetened" on the issue of collective security, in particular, provided with "proper assurances" about taking into account Soviet security needs. It was declared, in particular, that the American proposals for the unification of Germany, the "transformation" of NATO (shifting the emphasis of the organization from a military role to a political one) and strengthening the role of the CSCE "will not generate winners and losers", but "will create a new inclusive European structure", that US policy is not aimed at obtaining "unilateral advantages", nor on the separation of Eastern Europe from the Soviet Union and that the United States is striving for the USSR to be integrated into the "new Europe". Similar trends were traced in the "London Declaration on the Transformed Alliance" adopted in July 1990. The declarations of the USA and NATO found a certain response in the Soviet leadership, which in mid-July 1990 approved the unification of Germany on the basis of the "special military status" of the former GDR. The relevant provisions became the basis for the Final Settlement Agreement with respect to Germany.

Strength and status of assurances 
The main question in the context of the alleged guarantees of non-expansion of NATO to the east is whether the February 1990 assurances are a form of commitment. Opponents of the agreement claim view the 1990 statements as a diplomatic maneuver by the West in order to "probe" the position of the Soviet leadership and "help it overcome the obstacle" to the unification of Germany, and not as a binding agreement. In this regard, it is emphasized that the Soviet Union "could not" receive written guarantees about the non-expansion of NATO, it is argued that the United States and Germany only "briefly hinted" that such "could be negotiated", that "if there are no legal promises about the future membership and size of NATO, then there is nothing that could be considered as "violated"", and the main emphasis is on the Final Settlement Agreement with respect to Germany, the provisions of which do not contain rules concerning territories outside Germany.

Proponents of assertions about the existence of an agreement, in turn, write that informal agreements are important in world politics. So, Joshua Shifrinson writes that analysts have long understood that states do not need formal agreements when determining expectations of future political actions, and also refers to the statements of US Secretary of State John Kerry, who recognized that even "legally non-binding" agreements constitute a necessary tool of international politics and the practice of the Cold War, when informal agreements between the USSR and the USA defined the contours of the European security system (1950s and 1960s), and during the Cuban Missile Crisis of 1962, they played a significant role in preventing a nuclear war between the USSR and the United States. Mikhail Gorbachev himself, in an interview with Rossiyskaya Gazeta and its foreign appendices, claiming that "the question of "NATO expansion" was not discussed at all in those years and did not arise" (see also below), at the same time called NATO expansion to the east "a violation of the spirit of those statements and assurances that were given to us in 1990".

Statements regarding the non-proliferation of NATO to the east were also made to Russian President Boris Yeltsin. So, on October 22, 1993, the new US Secretary of State Warren Christopher told the president about the NATO Partnership for Peace program, designed for military cooperation with non-alliance states. Yeltsin, based on Christopher's words, considered that NATO had abandoned plans to expand to the east and decided to include all the countries of Eastern Europe and the CIS in the program, rather than include only some of them. Christopher later claimed that Yeltsin misunderstood him and the partnership did not exclude further accession at all, however, some American experts, based on the transcript of the meeting, believe that the Secretary of State deliberately misled Yeltsin by mentioning possible membership only briefly and at the end of the conversation.

Guarantor of agreements 
In connection with the question of the existence of an agreement, the problem of the entity that had the right to give guarantees on behalf of NATO is also raised. The leadership of the alliance itself in its statements emphasizes that such a decision could only be made by consensus of all the member countries of the bloc (that is, not in the form of a "sole guarantee" of anyone). Mary-Alice Sharot writes that the Soviet leadership "can be forgiven" for proceeding from the "leading positions" of the United States and Germany in the alliance and that their character is confirmed by a number of documentary evidence. Gorbachev, therefore, had "reasonable grounds" to believe that if a trusted US representative makes statements about the future of NATO, repeated shortly by the head of the West German state, then these statements have weight. Noting that the decisions of the United States, the USSR and West Germany on the future of the alliance would require the consent of the alliance itself, she writes at the same time that "in the political climate of 1990, it would be possible to provide such." Shifrinson also writes that taking into account "the dominance of the United States in NATO and their hypertrophied influence on the unification of Germany," understanding the American political line of that time is key in the question of the existence of agreements on non-expansion of NATO.

Scope of guarantees 
Another controversial issue is the scope of the alleged guarantees: whether the assurances made in February 1990 referred only to the GDR (East Germany) or also to Eastern Europe. Supporters of the agreement claim, referring to the explanations of Genscher's ideas about non-expansion given to Western diplomats, as well as to the "usual meaning" of the concept of the Eastern direction, consider the assurances of non-expansion as concerning Eastern Europe, while their opponents consider the issue of the "eastern direction" exclusively within the framework of what was said directly at the Soviet-Western negotiations, which According to them, they concerned only East Germany and did not affect the fate of Eastern European countries. Mikhail Gorbachev and Eduard Shevardnadze also claimed that the question of NATO's expansion into Eastern Europe "was not discussed at all in those years and did not arise", since the Warsaw Pact still existed. As the Belgian political scientist Tom Sauer points out, the argument that NATO expansion to other countries was not considered at that time does not stand up to criticism: Hungary had already raised the issue of expansion in February 1990, and a few weeks later the issue was considered by the US State Department. Genscher himself, on February 6, 1990 , explicitly indicated D. Gerd: "When I spoke about the unwillingness to expand NATO, this also applied to other countries besides the GDR."

A similar question is raised in connection with the statement made by NATO Secretary General Manfred Werner on May 17, 1990 that "the very fact that we are ready not to deploy NATO troops outside the territory of Germany gives the Soviet Union firm security guarantees": the Russian authorities refer to it as a guarantee of non-expansion of NATO beyond Germany, while opponents of such a interpretations write that the statement was made in the context of discussing the deployment of troops on the territory of the GDR, and not countries outside it.

According to representatives of NATO and the United States, the issue of restrictions on the accession of Eastern European countries to NATO could not be raised in principle because this restriction would contradict the "right to freely determine by states how to determine their own security" (recognized by the Final Act of the CSCE of 1975, as well as the "underlying" Treaty on the final settlement with respect to Germany and confirmed by a number of subsequent acts signed, among others, by representatives of the USSR and Russia — in particular, the Paris Charter of 1990, the declaration of the Budapest OSCE Summit of 1994 and some others). As US representatives stated in 1996, the USSR's right to discuss and establish "security parameters" in connection with the unification of Germany, "essentially limiting its sovereignty," stemmed from the supreme rights of the four victorious powers (USSR, USA, Great Britain and France) established following the Second World War in relation to Germany and "it has not set a precedent for Russian surveillance of other Central and Eastern European states."

Notes

References

Further reading
 

Russia–NATO relations
Opposition to NATO